Girish Tiwari "Girda" (10 September 1945 – 22 August 2010) was a scriptwriter, director, lyricist, singer, poet, organic culturist, literary writer, and social activist in Uttarakhand, India.

Early life

Born on 10 September 1945 in the village of Jyoli near Hawalbag in Almora District of Uttarakhand, he attended school at the Government Inter College in Almora and later schooling at Nainital. After meeting renowned lyricist and writer Late Brijendra Lal Sah, he realized his potential for creativity.

At the age of twenty-one, Girda met social activists at Lakheempur Khiri and got influenced by their work in the society. These meetings at such a tender age changed the life path of Girda and made him a creative writer and a social activist. He has been associated with the famed Chipko Movement and later with the Uttarakhand Andolan.

Career

Girda has directed famous plays like "Andha Yug", "Andher Nagri", "Thank you Mr. Glad" and "Bharat Durdasha". Girda has written plays including "Nagare Khamosh Hain" and "Dhanush Yagya". Girda edited "Shikharon ke Swar" in 1969, and later "Hamari Kavita ke Ankhar" and "Rang Dari Dio Albelin Main". His latest compilation of poems and songs specially focusing "Uttarakhand Andolan" and "Uttarakhand Kavya" which was published in 2002.

He took voluntary retirement from the post of instructorship in the Song and Drama Division of the Ministry of Information and Broadcasting, and thereafter joined the Uttarakhand movement, and took to full-time creative writing. He was one of the founders and member of the editorial board of PAHAR, a Nainital-based organisation involved with promotion of Himalayan culture.

Bedupako, the folk genome tank of Uttarakhand has published a small collection of Poem's in original voice of this legendary personality.  

He died on 22 August 2010, after a brief illness and was survived by his wife Hemlata Tiwari and one son.

Legacy
Pahar group (http://www.pahar.org) is compiling a book – "Girda Samarga" – which includes hundreds of his creative writings, songs, poems, essays etc.

References

Indian male dramatists and playwrights
Indian theatre directors
Hindi-language poets
1942 births
2010 deaths
People from Nainital
Activists from Uttarakhand
20th-century Indian poets
20th-century Indian dramatists and playwrights
Indian male poets
Poets from Uttarakhand
Dramatists and playwrights from Uttarakhand
20th-century Indian male writers